Captain Qwark (Copernicus Leslie Qwark; is a fictional character from Insomniac Games' Ratchet & Clank video game series. He first appeared in the 2002 video game Ratchet & Clank as the secondary antagonist then became the main antagonist of the sequel Ratchet & Clank: Going Commando. However, starting with the third game onward, he reforms and now assists the protagonists.

In the series, Qwark is portrayed as a self-absorbed, cowardly, and largely incompetent antihero willing to do anything to preserve his fame and public image. He is only willing to help when it benefits him personally, and is more than willing to betray his allies and fight against them when it suits him. However, as of the end of the third game, he mostly reforms and devotes himself to making up for his crimes, though his cowardly personality remains unchanged. Video game commentators have provided different opinions regarding the character; some criticized his personality, calling him an "idiot" and a "coward", while others have praised his role as a unique villain.

Appearances

Captain Copernicus Leslie Qwark was a renowned superhero and celebrity throughout the Solana Galaxy at the time of the first game. Unbeknownst to many of his fans, Qwark was also egocentric and greedy to the point of making a secret deal with Chairman Drek to be the spokesperson for the new artificial planet Drek was building, even though he knew that Drek was harvesting other planets and terrorizing their inhabitants to do so. After Ratchet and Clank started interfering with Drek's plans, Qwark tricked them into believing he would help take down Drek and lured the duo to his private training facility on Planet Umbris, where he left them to die in a pit holding a vicious Blargian Snagglebeast; after the duo defeated the Snagglebeast, Qwark travelled to the Gemlik Moonbase and used a starfighter provided by Drek in an attempt to kill Ratchet and Clank himself, only to be shot down after a fierce battle. Having crash-landed on Planet Oltanis, Qwark adopted the alias "Steve McQwark" and resorted to selling gadgets which he claimed were genuine Gadgetron products, such as the PDA (Personal Delivery Assistant), and later the Gadgetron Personal Hygenator.

Before the events of the second game, the following discovery of a key defect in the Hygenator which caused severe irritation in sensitive body areas, Qwark's true identity was exposed and he was quickly denounced as a fraud and a disgrace to Solana for previously working with Drek. He was then brought before a galactic court, which ordered him to pay 6 billion bolts to those suffering from Personal Hygenator Syndrome. Qwark refused to pay for the damages and attempted to flee to Planet Pokitaru two days later but was immediately recaptured and placed in prison awaiting trial. After escaping from prison by flushing himself down a prison toilet, Qwark managed to go underground for six weeks and re-adopted his alias as "Steve McQwark" before continuing to sell more Personal Hygenator units to unsuspecting customers, which he used to finance his comeback. Determined to restore his reputation, Qwark travelled to the neighboring Bogon Galaxy where he kidnapped Megacorp founder/CEO Abercrombie Fizzwidget, locked him in a supply closet, and used a sophisticated disguise to impersonate Fizzwidget to hire Ratchet and Clank to recover the Protopet, a failed Megacorp project that had been stolen by Angela Cross (posing as the "Thief") so she could destroy it. After recovering the Protopet, Qwark revealed his plan to mass-produce clones of the Protopet so he could manufacture a galaxy-wide crisis throughout Bogon, intending to frame Ratchet, Clank, and Angela for the disaster via Megacorp's broadcast system. He tries to neutralize the original Protopet's destructive tendencies with Angela's invention, the Helix-o-morph, rendering the copied Protopets harmless and thus restoring his ruined reputation; his plan failed when he accidentally put the batteries for the Helix-o-morph in backwards; this caused the original Protopet to mutate into a ferocious monster and devour Qwark. After Ratchet defeated the giant mutant Protopet, Angela fixed the Helix-o-morph and used it to neutralize the Protopets; as punishment, Qwark was assigned to work for Megacorp as a test subject on their newest product, the "Crotchitizer".

Some time later, Qwark fled from Bogon and returned to the Solana Galaxy to live in exile on Planet Florana, where he bonded with a native tribe of cycloptic monkeys, even making one of them his companion and naming him Skrunch. Over time, he developed "long-term amnesia", causing him to completely forget his previous life. Now believing himself to be a monkey, Qwark becomes the Florona Tree Beast named by the locals. Ratchet and Clank travel to Florona by order of President Phyronix to find and escort him - along with Skrunch - back to the starship Phoenix, where they are able to fully restore Qwark's memory of who he once was by playing an old Captain Qwark vid-comic. Put in charge of the fight against Dr. Nefarious by President Phyronix, Qwark assembles the Q-Force (consisting of Skrunch, Big Al, Skidd McMarxx, Helga, Sasha Phyronix, Ratchet, and Clank) and assigned Ratchet and Clank to carry out several dangerous missions (for which he took all the credit), while he and others remained on the ship taking advantage of its many amenities. Qwark only started to help when Clank (who was actually an evil duplicate named Klunk), revealed that Nefarious' star cruiser, the Leviathan, was docked at the Zeldrin Starport; Nefarious waited until the Q-Force boarded the ship and then activated its self-destruct sequence. Qwark remained behind, claiming to have seen something important, and was presumed dead and mourned by his teammates when in reality, he managed to escape, returning to his secret base in the Thran Asteroid Belt. Ratchet, Clank, and Skrunch, having learned about the secret base from another vid-comic, found and confronted Qwark; Ratchet and Skrunch angrily berated and shamed Qwark for his cowardice and selfishness while Clank appealed to him with encouragement that he has a chance to redeem himself for his mistakes and become the hero he always wanted to be. Qwark initially refuses to help, but with time and thought, he later returns to aid the duo in their final battle against Nefarious and his new "Biobliterator", flying in to distract Nefarious so Ratchet and Clank could focus on defeating him. Afterwards, Qwark attended the premiere of the new "Secret Agent Clank" Holo-Film with Skrunch.

During the events of Ratchet: Deadlocked, Qwark remained at home in Metropolis on Planet Kerwan and only appeared in-game as a voiceover at the end of the game. He falsely claims that the "hero-kidnapping business" Ratchet was caught up in doesn't exist, because DreadZone didn't try to kidnap him. It can be assumed that Gleeman Vox didn't consider Qwark to be enough of a "hero" to warrant the trouble of abducting him. 

Several years later, Qwark, now employed as head of Kerwan's defense network, sent a distress call to Ratchet and Clank after he was attacked by Emperor Tachyon's forces at the Planetary Defense Center. In order to save himself, Qwark allied himself with Tachyon but instead worked as a double agent to assist Ratchet and Clank. He later attempted to destroy the Dimensionator but instead ended up delivering it to Tachyon on the ruined Cragmite homeworld of Planet Reepor. Qwark later ended up shut in a cupboard in Meridian City on Planet Igliak and remained behind to help rebuild the city after Tachyon's army ravaged it. He was later present at the Apogee Space Station when the Zoni abducted Clank.

Two years later, Qwark returned to being a "hero" after a stint in acting for his vanity project, “My Blaster Runs Hot”, and joined Ratchet in his search for Clank. Qwark proved to be of some use during their traversal of Planet Quantos; after being captured by Lord Vorselon and rescued by Ratchet, Qwark helped the Fongoid residents of Quantos to escape. He later travelled to the Agorian Battleplex where he ended up fighting in the arena; after being saved again by Ratchet, Qwark adopted the Agorian's war grok and named it Snowball. He then used his high-school drama class training to go undercover as "Nurse Shannon" on the Nefarious Space Station. Despite being captured while helping Ratchet and Clank destroy Nefarious' war fleet, Qwark escaped and with Snowball's help, held Nefarious' troops off long enough for Ratchet to reach Nefarious.

In the Ratchet & Clank comic book series, Qwark is shown to have been elected as Galactic President of Polaris at some point, leading to retribution against him by his former opponent, Artemis Zogg. Qwark was able to obtain crucial information on Zogg's Helios Project but played very little part in any actual heroics, instead preferring to call on Ratchet and Clank again after they were rescued from prison. Qwark was still president during the events of Ratchet & Clank: All 4 One but relinquished this role at an unknown point afterwards. Six months later, the now-retired Qwark joined forces once more with Ratchet and Clank to defeat one of his former fans, Stuart Zurgo.

Qwark played a minor role in Ratchet & Clank: Into the Nexus by towing Ratchet's ship, Aphelion, to Planet Yerek, and later by assisting Neftin Prog and Pollyx to repair the Lombax Dimensionator in an ultimately successful effort to prevent extra-dimensional creatures from conquering the galaxy.

Qwark makes a minor appearance in Ratchet & Clank: Rift Apart, which also introduces his alternate universe counterpart, Captain Quantum.

Spin-off material
In Ratchet & Clank: Size Matters, Qwark was noticed by Clank stalking him and Ratchet during their vacation on Planet Pokitaru; tired of Qwark constantly following them around, Clank asks the captain if he has a family to spend time with. This upsets Qwark as he admits that he never knew his mother and father, having been raised by monkeys as a baby. Qwark later catches up with Ratchet and Clank after they recover the Technomite Artifact and begins secretly following the duo in the hopes that they'll let him tag along. Ratchet and Clank finally agree to let Qwark use their ship's computer to research his family history to get him off their backs. Qwark is then deceived by Emperor Otto Destruct of the Technomites, who claims to be his biological father and gets the gullible Qwark to help with his plan of enlarging himself and conquering the galaxy. After Ratchet and Clank defeated Otto, Skrunch arrives with a newspaper and a picture of Qwark's real parents, which reveals they were killed by defective Technomite technology. Upon learning the truth, Qwark was enraged that Otto knew what happened to his parents and used that knowledge against him to get what he wanted. Seeking to get revenge against Otto, Qwark straps him in his own Intelligence Machine, intending to switch Otto's superior intellect with his own lower intelligence. Ratchet and Clank attempt in vain to reason with Qwark before Otto takes Ratchet's shrink ray to shrink him; however, this caused Skrunch to accidentally switch places with Qwark and trade minds with Otto, rendering him stupid and harmless. Qwark, still shrunken, is taken to Ratchet and Clank's apartment, where he starts telling exaggerated stories of his heroic deeds to Ratchet's clones. In the following games, Qwark has somehow returned to normal size without explanation.

In Secret Agent Clank, Qwark is anonymously paid to write his autobiography and starts traveling with a biographer, B.A.R.N.E.Y. (Biographical Analysis Robot Neo Eight Yellow); this allows him to make up dozens of false stories about his heroism, from saving a city from a giant mechanical monster to matching wits with the "Jack of All Trades", singing in an opera house musical, rescuing space nuns and orphans and fighting wild western "Cactus Beasts". After Clank defeated his evil counterpart Klunk, Qwark showed up wearing nothing but his swimming trunks, seemingly surprised that Clank had found him. Attempting to take a teleporter back to the surface, Qwark accidentally teleports himself onto Klunk's satellite; at the instruction of Clank, he removed the Eye of Infinity just before the laser activated, destroying the satellite, before teleporting himself out just in the nick of time. It was revealed in the final report that Qwark was in fact, like Ratchet and Clank, caught up in Klunk's schemes. Klunk is revealed to be responsible for paying Qwark the money for his biography, correctly guessing that Qwark would use a tracking device to follow Clank, allowing Klunk to keep tabs on the secret agent without employing a lackey. When B.A.R.N.E.Y. revealed that he was secretly one of Klunk's minions, the enraged captain tried to destroy the robot, only to accidentally transform him into an Ultra-Mech; as it turned out, B.A.R.N.E.Y. was programmed to kill Qwark if anything were to happen to Klunk, presumably to eliminate all witnesses. However, Clank showed up just in time to save him and destroyed B.A.R.N.E.Y.

Qwark makes a cameo appearance in PlayStation All-Stars Battle Royale as part of the Metropolis stage, where he is attacked and swallowed by the Hydra from God of War before narrowly escaping as it tries to digest him. Qwark also appears in the game as an unlockable minion.

Reimagined series
In the reimagined Ratchet and Clank, Qwark's backstory is significantly altered, although his basic personality and appearance remain unchanged. He is portrayed as the founder and leader of the Galactic Rangers, a team of highly trained commandos and secret agents that fight villainy and crime throughout the Solana Galaxy. Ratchet, like most of Solana's citizens, idolizes Qwark, who eagerly basks in all the attention and fame he receives. When Ratchet enters a competition  held by the Rangers on Planet Veldin to find new recruits, he is brought before Qwark and his top agents for a special review. Qwark tells Ratchet that he has decent abilities, but that because of his "loose-cannon" nature, he is too much of a risk to be accepted as a Ranger, although it is also implied that Qwark is somewhat resentful of Ratchet easily passing his tests. Later, when Ratchet and his new friend Clank stop an attempt by the Blargian forces of Chairman Drek to destroy the Ranger headquarters on Planet Kerwan, Qwark tries to shoo them away but is confronted by news reporters before he can do so; under public pressure, he allows the two to join the Rangers.

At first, Qwark seems accepting of his new agents, tasking them with undertaking several missions against Drek and the Blarg. However, as the duo begin to win fame and admiration for their exploits, Qwark becomes jealous and starts to fear that he might be forgotten. He cuts a secret deal with Drek, offering to spy on the Rangers in the hopes of embarrassing Ratchet and Clank and destroying their fame. He finally succeeds when the Rangers are unable to prevent Drek and his ally, Doctor Nefarious, from destroying Planet Novalis; Ratchet learns of Qwark's treachery and informs the Rangers. Shattered by the revelation of their leader's true nature, the Rangers lose the will to keep fighting and Ratchet himself nearly gives up before Clank persuades him not to.

Although Qwark's plan is a success, he quickly becomes ridden with guilt and realizes that Drek and Nefarious have no intention of honoring their promise to spare the Rangers; when he confronts them, Nefarious simply laughs and mocks him as a spineless coward for betraying his friends; humiliated, Qwark simply walks away as Nefarious gets rid of Drek and begins his own plan to destroy all life in the Solana Galaxy. A bitter Qwark then starts blaming Ratchet for his mistakes, and when Ratchet is caught trying to sabotage Nefarious's plans, Qwark arms himself with several deadly weapons and attacks him. Ratchet defeats Qwark and forces him to accept responsibility for his failures. Realizing that he is no longer fit to serve, Qwark passes his leadership role to Ratchet. 

Qwark then takes Ratchet and Clank to Nefarious to arrest him; Nefarious tries to destroy another planet with his "Deplanetizer", but the Rangers stop him in time. Nefarious then switches to his contingency plan: using a nearby dwarf star to trigger a supernova that will result in untold death and destruction across the galaxy. Ratchet is able to defeat him, and Nefarious drifts into the path of the star and disintegrates from its intense heat. Qwark manages to fire up a single teleporter in time for him and the others to escape as the Deplanetizer falls apart. With the galaxy saved, Qwark is arrested and sentenced to prison for his crimes. He befriends his cellmate, Shiv Helix, as Shiv happens to be a fan and eagerly listens to Qwark as he shares his side of the story. While performing community service, Shiv hijacks a ship and escapes. Ratchet and Clank prepare to go after him, and upon noticing how sad Qwark looks, they invite him to come along and help. Qwark accepts without hesitation and follows them.

Reception
In his review of Ratchet & Clank, Gavin Frankle of Allgame stated that Captain Qwark's scenes (along with Chairman Drek's) proved to be more entertaining than those of the main characters. His comical trait was also commended by several reviewers, including CraveOnline, GamesRadar, and GameSpot, with the latter adding he is "useless and unwanted as expected". He was included in GameSpot's "All Time Greatest Video Game Villain" contest and reached the "Round 2" before losing to General RAAM. Qwark was included on "10 Best Dressed Gaming Characters" by CraveOnline as "Qwark is bombastic, over-the-top, and comically worthless…just like his spandex". GamesRadar listed Qwark as one of the "Bestest Frenemies", "cowards in gaming", and "Villains that need their own spin-off games". IGN ranked him 54th on their list of "The Top 100 Videogame Villains", saying Qwark's "biggest fault, [...], is his cowardice". Reviewing Ratchet & Clank: Into the Nexus, Hardcore Gamer stated Qwark "mean a lot to fans of the franchise", noting its disappointment as he should "get more screen time".

References

Fictional actors
Fictional presidents
Extraterrestrial characters in video games
Extraterrestrial superheroes
Extraterrestrial supervillains
Male characters in video games
Narcissism in fiction
Politician characters in video games
Ratchet & Clank characters
Sony Interactive Entertainment antagonists
Sony Interactive Entertainment protagonists
Video game characters with superhuman strength
Video game characters introduced in 2002
Video game superheroes
Video game bosses